Group B of the 1996 Fed Cup Europe/Africa Zone Group II was one of four pools in the Europe/Africa zone of the 1996 Fed Cup. Four teams competed in a round robin competition, with the top two teams advancing to the play-offs.

Finland vs. Turkey

Tunisia vs. Liechtenstein

Finland vs. Tunisia

Liechtenstein vs. Cyprus

Turkey vs. Liechtenstein

Tunisia vs. Cyprus

Finland vs. Liechtenstein

Turkey vs. Cyprus

Finland vs. Cyprus

Turkey vs. Tunisia

See also
Fed Cup structure

References

External links
 Fed Cup website

1996 Fed Cup Europe/Africa Zone